The Beast may refer to one of two beasts described in the Book of Revelation.

In Revelation 13:1-10, the first beast (interpreted as the Antichrist) rises "out of the sea" and is given authority and power by the dragon. This first beast is initially mentioned in Revelation 11:7 as emerging from the abyss. His appearance is described in detail in Revelation 13:1–10, and some of the mystery surrounding it is revealed in Revelation 17:7–18.

In Revelation 13:11–18, the second beast, later known as the false prophet, comes "out of the earth" and forces everyone on earth to worship the first beast.

In their fight against God, the two beasts join forces with the dragon. They persecute the "saints" and those who do not "worship the image of the beast [of the sea]" and influence the kings of the earth through three unclean spirits to gather for the battle of Armageddon. The two beasts are defeated by Christ and are thrown into the lake of fire mentioned in Revelation 19:18–20.

Book of Revelation

Beast from the Sea

The description of the beast is found in Revelation chapters thirteen and seventeen. Chapter thirteen gives the fullest description. John saw it "rise up out of the sea, having seven heads and ten horns, and upon his horns ten crowns, and upon his heads the name of blasphemy." It was like a leopard, with feet like the feet of a bear, and had a mouth like a lion. One of its heads had a mortal wound which healed itself, causing people to wonder at it and follow it. This description draws many parallels with a vision in the Book of Daniel where four beasts symbolizing a succession of kingdoms come out of the sea in the forms of a lion, bear, leopard and a beast with ten horns.

Beast from the Earth
The second beast is primarily described in Revelation chapter thirteen.  This second beast comes out of the earth whose overall appearance is not described, other than having "two horns like a lamb", and speaking "like a dragon". His purpose is to promote the authority of the first beast with the ability to perform great signs, even making fire come down out of Heaven. This second beast is also called the false prophet. He speaks like a dragon commanding the people of the Earth to make an image "to" the beast that was wounded by a sword. It is declared that anyone who does not worship the beast or its image would be killed. The lamb-horned beast from the earth also causes all people to receive the mark of the beast "in their right hand or in their forehead."

A Third Beast
Revelation 17 mentions a third beast described as "a scarlet coloured beast, full of names of blasphemy, having seven heads and ten horns." and some of the symbols are explained. The scarlet beast is another, distinct, visualisation of the same subject as the beast of the sea. The scarlet beast is shown being ridden by a harlot who "reigns over the kings of the earth", whereas the beast of the sea is not described as being ridden, and is given "power and great authority." The seven heads represent both seven mountains and seven kings, and the ten horns are ten kings who have not yet received kingdoms. Of the seven kings, five have fallen, one is, the other has not yet come. The beast itself is an eighth king who is of the seven and "was and is not and shall ascend out of the bottomless pit, and go into perdition."

Image of the Beast
Those who dwell on the earth are deceived into making an image [interpreted as a statue]  of the beast as a means to worship its authority. The false prophet breathes life into the "image of the beast", so that the image becomes alive and is able to speak. It also declares to anyone who does not worship the authority of the beast. Those who are killed for not conforming to the authority of the beast are blessed through the "first resurrection" that allows them to rule in Christ's presence as priests during the one thousand-year reign. The second death has no power over these individuals who were victorious over the beast by not being deceived, even though they lost their lives on Earth by his authority.

Mark of the Beast

The number of the beast is associated with the Beast  in chapter 13, verse 18 of the Book of Revelation. Papyrus 115 (which is the oldest preserved manuscript of the Revelation ), as well as other ancient sources like Codex Ephraemi Rescriptus, give the number of the beast as χιϛ or χιϲ (transliterable in Arabic numerals as "616"), not 666; critical editions of the Greek text, such as the Novum Testamentum Graece, note  as a variant.

In Roman Numerals, in use when the Book of Revelation was written, the mark of the beast in Revelation 17:9 is rendered DCLXVI 'The Roman numeral for 666, DCLXVI, has exactly one occurrence of all symbols whose value is less than 1000 in decreasing order (D = 500, C = 100, L = 50, X = 10, V = 5, I = 1).'

The seven heads of the beast are described in Revelation as representing seven hills.

Rome was built on seven hills.

The mark of the beast is interpreted differently in the four main views of Christian eschatology.

Fate of the Beast and the False Prophet
Heaven opens and a figure on a white horse appears, followed by "the armies which were in heaven".

The beast and the kings of the earth and their armies gather to prepare for war against them. The beast is taken, along with the false prophet, and they are thrown alive into "the lake of fire" and the rest are killed. In chapter twenty, after the dragon is freed from the abyss and deceives the nations, the dragon is thrown into the lake of fire, where the beast and the false prophet are and will be tormented day and night forever and ever.

Interpretations

Preterism

Preterism is a Christian eschatological view that interprets prophecies of the Bible, especially the Books of Daniel and Revelation, by reference to events that had already happened. Preterist academic scholars generally identify the first beast from the sea with the Roman Empire, particularly with Emperor Nero.

The beast from the earth is generally identified with the Roman imperial cult. Sometimes there is a particular identification with a personage such as a chief administrator of Roman rule in Ephesus and Asia Minor. This is probably the provincial governor (or proconsul) who would have overseen the political and religious operations of the area from his capital in Ephesus or the High Priest of the provincial imperial cult. The imperial cult in Ephesus was set up by Domitian in AD 89. (Ephesus is the location of one of the Seven Churches in Asia to whom the Book of Revelation was addressed.)

The five kings who have fallen are seen as Julius, Augustus, Tiberius, Caligula and Claudius; Galba is the one who "has not yet come, but when he does come, he must remain for a little while".. Moreover, Rome was known in antiquity as the city of seven hills and Revelation was a warning about events that were "shortly" to take place (Revelation 1:1).

In , the beast was given a mouth speaking in blasphemies against God and his name. Inscriptions have been found in Ephesus in which Nero is called "Almighty God" and "Savior". In verse 4, the beast is worshiped by the world alongside the dragon that gave it authority. Nero and Caligula "abandoned all reserve" in promoting emperor worship—they were the only two who demanded divine honors while still alive. Nero claimed to be the sun-god Apollo.

 speaks of the power given to the beast to make war with the saints. Nero was the first of the imperial authorities to persecute Christianity. Tacitus records the scene in Rome when the persecution of Christians (or Chrestians) broke out: "And their death was aggravated with mockeries, insomuch that, wrapped in the hides of wild beasts, they were torn to pieces by dogs, or fastened to crosses to be set on fire, that when the darkness fell they might be burned to illuminate the night."

Revelation 13:5 says that the beast would continue for 42 months. The Neronic persecution was instituted in AD 64 and lasted until his death in June AD 68, which is three and a half years, or 42 months. Nero was even called the beast. Apollonius of Tyana specifically states that Nero was called a beast:
 "In my travels, which have been wider than ever man yet accomplished, I have seen man, many wild beasts of Arabia and India; but this beast, that is commonly called a Tyrant, I know not how many heads it has, nor if it be crooked of claw, and armed with horrible fangs. ... And of wild beasts you cannot say that they were ever known to eat their own mother, but Nero has gorged himself on this diet."

The manner of Nero's death corresponds with the prophecy of : "If anyone is destined for captivity, to captivity he goes; if any one kills with the sword, with the sword he must be killed." According to Tertullian, Nero was the first to assail the Christian sect with the imperial sword. He committed suicide by the sword at age 30.

After Nero's death in AD 68, Rome saw a quick succession of short-lived emperors (Galba, Otho, and Vitellius) and a year of civil wars until Vespasian eventually took control in AD 69. The Roman Empire destabilized so greatly that Tacitus reported: "Many believed the end of the empire was at hand". According to Suetonius, to the surprise of the world, "the empire which for a long time had been unsettled and, as it were, drifting through the usurpation and violent death of three emperors, was at last taken in and given stability by the Flavian family". This may be a reference to the mortal wound on one of the heads of the beast "inflicted by the sword" which was later healed. D.K. Wong (2003) wrote that the "healing of the wound" alludes to the so-called Nero Redivivus legend ("revival of Nero" myth). A rumour said that Nero had just disappeared to Parthia, and would one day reappear.

Finally, the readers of Revelation were told to "calculate the number of the beast, for the number is that of a man; and his number is six hundred and sixty-six" (Rev. 13:18). John did not expect that his readers "who had understanding" to have any difficulty identifying the beast, since they could simply calculate the meaning of this number. "Neron Kaisar" ( the Greek rendering, documented by archaeological finds), transliterated into Hebrew  (Nrwn Qsr). When using standard mispar hechrechi encoding of gematria, adding the corresponding values yields 666, as shown:

The variant number 616 found in some manuscripts of the Greek text of Revelation may represent the alternative Hebrew spelling  (Nrw Qsr) based on the Latin form "Nero Caesar". The variant probably existed to keep consistent the meaning of Nero as the beast.

Historicism

Historicism is a method of interpretation in Christian eschatology which interprets biblical prophecies as actual historical events and identifies symbolic beings with historical persons or societies in the history of the church. This interpretation was favored by the Protestant reformers such as John Wycliff and Martin Luther, as well as other prominent figures such as Isaac Newton.

According to this interpretation, the beast and false prophet were most commonly identified with the papacy in its political and religious aspects.

The identification with the papacy is a viewpoint echoed by Seventh-day Adventist writers. According to the Seventh-day Adventist Church, the "image to the beast" represents Protestant churches which will form an alliance with the papacy, and the "mark of the beast" refers to a future universal Sunday law. Adventists have interpreted the number of the beast, 666, as corresponding to a Latin title Vicarius Filii Dei of the pope. The number 666 is calculated by using a form of gematria where only the letters which refer to Latin numerals are counted.

In 1866, Uriah Smith was the first to propose the interpretation to the Seventh-day Adventist Church. In The United States in the Light of Prophecy he wrote,

Adventist scholar J. N. Andrews also adopted this view. Uriah Smith maintained his interpretation in the various editions of Thoughts on Daniel and the Revelation, which was influential in the church.

Jimmy Akin of Catholic Answers and additional Catholic sources Our Sunday Visitor, a Catholic newspaper (see Vicarius Filii Dei), disagree with the above argument because, "although Vicarius Filii Dei adds up to 666, is not a title of the pope".

The beast from the earth has also been interpreted as the Islamic prophet Muhammed, according to some medieval Christians, particularly Pope Innocent III; Saracens and Antipopes, according to other medieval Christians, particularly Joachim of Fiore; and the government of the United States of America (this is the view of the Seventh-day Adventist Church). This interpretation was introduced by Adventist pioneer John Nevins Andrews.

Samuele Bacchiocchi, an Adventist scholar, has noted that Seventh-day Adventist teaching is moving away from historicism towards a more symbolic interpretation of the mark of the beast.

The Historicist interpretation has fallen out of favor with modern commentaries on Revelation, partially because it has failed to form a consensus on how the outline of the book of Revelation corresponds with history.

Idealism

Idealism, also known as the allegorical or symbolic approach, is an interpretation of the book of Revelation that sees the imagery of the book as non-literal symbols.  This is a common viewpoint of modern Christian scholars such as Gregory Beale in his New International Greek Testament Commentary on the Book of Revelation.  Some Idealist interpretations identify none of the book's symbols with particular historical events while some idealists like Beale take a more eclectic approach which see that the book portrays events throughout history while also predicting some future events such as the return of Christ.

In this view, the beast from the sea is interpreted as the state or any human kingdom that is in opposition to God. This would include the Roman Empire but would broadly apply to all empires. Scholars take their cue from the parallels between Revelation 13 and Daniel 7, noting that in Daniel 7:17 that the beasts are revealed as kingdoms. Therefore, given that the beast of Revelation thirteen is a composite of the beasts of Daniel, one should similarly interpret this beast as a kingdom, more specifically a composite of all kingdoms. Similarly, in some idealist circles, it is suggested that the beast represents different social injustices, such as exploitation of workers, wealth, the elite, commerce, materialism, and imperialism. Various Christian anarchists, such as Jacques Ellul, have associated the State and political power as the beast.

The Idealist interpretation of the beast from the earth is that it represents religious, cultural and economic powers within society which work to compel people to give their allegiance to the state or governmental powers.  This was first expressed in the imperial cult of Rome, but finds expression at all times of history. In his commentary, Michael Wilcock says "Religion, indeed is too narrow an identification of the second beast.  He is, in modern parlance, the ideology-whether religious, philosophical, or political-which 'gives breath to' any human social structure organized independently of God."

The Idealist perspective on the number of the beast rejects gematria, envisioning the number not as a code to be broken, but a symbol to be understood. Because there are so many names that can come to 666 and that most systems require converting names to other languages or adding titles when convenient, it has been impossible to come to a consensus. Given that numbers are used figuratively throughout the book of Revelation, idealists interpret this number figuratively as well. The common suggestion is that because seven is a number of completeness and is associated with the divine, that six is incomplete and the three sixes mean completely incomplete. Other scholars focus not on incompleteness but on the beast's ability to imitate perfection, that is, to appear authentic. Since the number six is one short of the perfect number seven, the beast's number bears "most of the hallmarks of truth, and so it can easily deceive".

The Idealist interpretation in which the beast finds expression in the socio-cultural, economic and political arena of all human activities since the existence of man best describes the scriptural perspective of the beast. This position was fully annunciated by Chike Udolisa is his book. In this perspective, the image of the four kingdoms that were to rule the world as shown to Nebuchadnezzar were equated to the four beasts revealed to Daniel, and to the seven-headed beast revealed to John. Furthermore, the revelation in Daniel 7 of four beasts comprising a lion, bear and leopard also correlates with the seven-headed beast as shown to John in  having the same features of the lion, bear and leopard. Thus the beast represents the kingdoms that will bear rule over the world from Adam until the second coming of Christ. While in the spirit, this beast is seen as a personality as in Revelation 19:20, in the physical he is represented at different ages throughout the period of human existence as different kingdoms. The import of this interpretation is that as the Whore of Babylon is seen to be riding this beast, the beast is the seat of operation of the whore from where she is expressed, and by whom her dominion is exercised. This corresponds to Revelation 13 where the power exercised by this beast was completely that of the dragon. This brings to light the scriptural fact that the governments of the nations are puppets in the hands of this beast, consistent with the truth that the whole world system is under the dragon, the god of this world.

St. Augustine of Hippo  takes a more Idealist interpretation when he writes

Futurism

Futurism is a Christian eschatological view that interprets portions of the Book of Revelation and the Book of Daniel as future events in a literal, physical, apocalyptic, and global context. This viewpoint is adopted by Dispensationalism and has become deeply rooted in American Evangelical churches.

Futurism interprets the beast from the sea to represent a revived Roman empire that will oppose Christians in the last days. Futurists would admit the symbolic ties to Rome and would interpret that the recovery from the fatal head wound would refer to a revival of this empire in the last days. It is usually understood that this revived empire will be ruled by the Antichrist, though some refer to the beast as the Antichrist. Futurist scholars, such as John Walvoord, identify this beast not as the individual ruler but as the revived Roman empire, noting that the reference to Rome's seven hills and the connection to the beasts in Daniel seven indicate that the beast represents a kingdom.

Futurism interprets the beast from the earth, or false prophet, as the future head of the apostate church or as a future expression of false religion in general.

Interpretation of the mark or number of the beast is similar to the idealist view suggesting that the number six refers to imperfection, falling short of the divine number seven.

Alternative views
 The Bahá'í Faith identifies the Beast to be the Umayyad Caliphate, who waged spiritual war against the "two witnesses," understood to be Muhammad, the founder of Islam, and Ali.
 Aleister Crowley claimed that he was the Beast prophesied in Revelation and used the name  (To Méga Thēríon), Greek for "The Great Beast", which adds up to 666 by isopsephy, the Greek form of gematria.
 During the New Deal, some ministers identified the Congress of Industrial Organizations as a "Sign of the Beast". Outside of black churches, 20th-century evangelicalism in America tended to regard labor unions as the mark of the beast, although evangelicals originally worked to eliminate class distinctions.
 Some identify the Beast with a supercomputer in Brussels, Belgium. However, author Joe Musser attributes the origin of this urban legend to his 1970 novel Behold, a Pale Horse and to an ad campaign promoting the movie The Rapture which featured the Brussels-based supercomputer. This ad campaign consisted of make-believe newspapers containing "reports" on various aspects of the movie. Musser speculates that stories subsequently run in an unnamed Pennsylvania newspaper and a 1976 issue of Christian Life magazine were mistakenly based on these ads.
 Several websites identify the beast as referring to an indistinct modern-day cartel of banking organizations, sometimes referred to as the "New World Order". The theory extends to the digitization of money and the possible use of RFID chips in humans as being the mark of the beast without which none may buy or sell.  An example of this is consumer privacy advocates, Katherine Albrecht and Liz McIntyre, who believe spychips must be resisted because they argue that modern database and communications technologies, coupled with point of sale data-capture equipment and sophisticated ID and authentication systems, now make it possible to require a biometrically associated number or mark to make purchases. They fear that the ability to implement such a system closely resembles the number of the beast prophesied in the Book of Revelation.
 Various Christian anarchists, such as J. Ellul, have identified the State and political power as the beast in the Book of Revelation.

See also

 Abomination of desolation
 Behemoth, a beast mentioned in the Tanakh (Old Testament)
 Dābbat al-Arḍ in Islamic belief
 Events of Revelation (Chapter 13)
 Lotan, the seven-headed sea serpent or dragon of Ugaritic myths
 Mušḫuššu
 Therion (Thelema)

Notes

Bible-related controversies
Book of Revelation
New Testament words and phrases
Numerology
Seven in the Book of Revelation